Vanadium(II) bromide is a inorganic compound with the formula VBr2. It adopts the cadmium iodide structure, featuring octahedral V(II) centers.  A hexahydrate is also known. The hexahydrate undergoes partial dehydration to give the tetrahydrate.  Both the hexa- and tetrahydrates are bluish in color.  The compound is produced by the reduction of vanadium(III) bromide with hydrogen.

The compound is produced by the reduction of vanadium(III) bromide with hydrogen.

Further reading
Stebler, A.; Leuenberger, B.; Guedel, H. U.  "Synthesis and crystal growth of A3M2X9 (A = Cs, Rb; M = Ti, V, Cr; X = Cl, Br)"    Inorganic Syntheses  (1989),  volume 26, pages 377–85.

References

Bromides
Metal halides
Vanadium(II) compounds